The 2000 Currie Cup Top 8 was the final stage of the 2000 Currie Cup season, the 62nd season in the competition since it started in 1889.

Competition

Qualification

The fourteen provincial teams were divided into two sections (called Section X and Section Y) during the 2000 Currie Cup qualification tournament. Each team played every other team in their section once. The four top teams in each section qualified to the 2000 Currie Cup Top 8 competition, with all points earned against the other Top 8 teams carried forward to the Top 8. All teams played the teams that qualified from the other section once. Teams who qualified from the same section did not play each other again.

Teams received four points for a win and two points for a draw. Bonus points were awarded to teams that score four or more tries in a game, as well as to teams that lost a match by seven points or less. Teams were ranked by points, then points difference (points scored less points conceded).

The top four teams qualified for the title play-offs. In the semi-finals, the team that finished first had home advantage against the team that finished fourth, while the team that finished second had home advantage against the team that finished third. The winners of these semi-finals played each other in the final, at the home venue of the higher-placed team.

Teams

Log

The following playing records were brought forward from the 2000 Currie Cup qualification series:

Results

Round one

Round two

Round three

Round four

Semi-finals

Final

See also
 2000 Currie Cup qualification
 2000 Bankfin Cup

References

Top